Sandry Roberto Santos Goes (born 30 August 2002), simply known as Sandry, is a Brazilian footballer who plays for Santos as a defensive midfielder.

Club career

Santos
Born in Itabuna, Bahia, Sandry joined Santos' youth setup in 2013, aged ten. In 2018, aged only 15, he appeared with the under-20s in the year's Copa São Paulo de Futebol Júnior.

Called up to the first team by new manager Jorge Sampaoli, Sandry made his debut with the main squad on 31 January 2019, coming on as a late substitute for goalscorer Derlis González in a 4–1 Campeonato Paulista away routing of Bragantino. On 5 August, after lengthy negotiations, he signed a professional contract with the club.

Sandry made his Série A debut on 8 December 2019, replacing goalscorer Carlos Sánchez late into a 4–0 home routing of Flamengo. He made his Copa Libertadores debut the following 20 October, replacing Jobson in a 2–1 home win against Defensa y Justicia.

On 10 November 2020, it was announced that Sandry and a further six first team players tested positive for COVID-19. On 3 April of the following year, it was announced that he suffered a knee injury, being sidelined for at least six months.

On 17 June 2021, Sandry renewed his contract with Peixe until May 2026.

International career
During the 2017 season, Sandry featured in Brazil under-15s' matches regularly. On 20 September 2019, he was included in Guilherme Dalla Déa's 21-man list for the 2019 FIFA U-17 World Cup, featuring mainly as a substitute as his side lifted the trophy for the fourth time.

Personal life
Sandry's father Nenenzinho was also a footballer and a midfielder. He was named after manager Lori Sandri, after his parents were watching a football match on the TV and "thought the name was pretty".

Career statistics

Honours
Brazil U17
 FIFA U-17 World Cup: 2019

References

External links

Santos official profile 

2002 births
Living people
Sportspeople from Bahia
Brazilian footballers
Association football midfielders
Campeonato Brasileiro Série A players
Santos FC players
Brazil youth international footballers